Claude Vernon Ricketts (February 23, 1906 – July 6, 1964) was a four-star admiral in the United States Navy, who served as the Vice Chief of Naval Operations from 1961 to 1964.

Biography
Ricketts graduated from high school in Kansas in 1922.  
He enlisted in the Navy, attended the United States Naval Academy, and became an officer upon his graduation in 1929. He was captain of the boxing team for two years at Annapolis.  As a lieutenant, he was the gunnery officer on board the  during the attack on Pearl Harbor.  In addition to his duties with the anti-aircraft battery, he helped attend dying captain Mervyn Bennion, with the aid of Doris Miller; assisted in counter-flooding the ship after it heeled over from six torpedoes and two bombs; and assisted in fire fighting. He was awarded with the Legion of Merit and the Navy Commendation Medal for his service in World War II.

Ricketts commanded  during 1955. In July 1952 he became head of the Amphibious Warfare Branch in the Office of the Chief of Naval Operations under command of Admiral William Fechteler. He later became commander of the Second Fleet and then assumed duties as the Vice Chief of Naval Operations in September 1961. He succeeded admiral James Sargent Russell in this capacity.

Admiral Claude Vernon Ricketts died of a massive heart attack on July 6, 1964, while still in office. He was posthumously awarded the Navy Distinguished Service Medal for his service as Vice Chief of Naval Operations. After his death, the destroyer USS Biddle was renamed  in his honor, as was Ricketts Hall at the Naval Academy.

Claude's son Rear Admiral Myron Ricketts, USN Ret., designed and engineered many ships.

Decorations

Here is the ribbon bar of Admiral Claude V. Ricketts:

See also

References

1906 births
1964 deaths
Military personnel from Missouri
United States Naval Academy alumni
United States Navy admirals
Vice Chiefs of Naval Operations
United States Navy personnel of World War II
Recipients of the Navy Distinguished Service Medal
Recipients of the Legion of Merit
Attack on Pearl Harbor
Burials at Arlington National Cemetery